A Woman a Man Walked By is the second collaborative studio album by English alternative rock musicians PJ Harvey and John Parish, released on 27 March 2009 by Island Records.

Background
It is the second collaboration between Harvey and Parish, following 1996's Dance Hall at Louse Point. The album was recorded in Bristol and Dorset, and mixed by Flood.  This album is made up of ten new songs. All the music is written by Parish, who also plays most of the instruments.  The vocals and all lyrics are by Harvey.  The first single from the album is "Black Hearted Love" which is described as having 'anthemic grunge-pop guitars.'

Critical reception

At Metacritic, which assigns a normalised rating out of 100 to reviews from mainstream critics, the album received an average score of 75, based on 27 reviews, which indicates "Generally favorable reviews".

The album was described by journalist John Harris, as "...mischievous, deadly serious, elegant and poetic, and possessed of a brutal power –   it is doubtful that you will hear a record as brimming with creative brio and musical invention this year..." In a track by track synopsis on their website, The Fly described the album as "a body of folk tales, funeral songs and trapped, tangled love songs... brilliant."

Track list
All songs written by PJ Harvey and John Parish.
"Black Hearted Love" – 4:40
"Sixteen, Fifteen, Fourteen" – 3:35
"Leaving California" – 3:56
"The Chair" – 2:29
"April" – 4:41
"A Woman a Man Walked By/The Crow Knows Where All the Little Children Go" – 4:47
"The Soldier" – 3:55
"Pig Will Not" – 3:50
"Passionless, Pointless" – 4:19
"Cracks in the Canvas" – 1:54

Personnel
Polly Jean Harvey – lyrics, vocals
John Parish – guitars, drums, organ, ukulele, banjo

Additional musicians
Eric Drew Feldman – bass guitar on "Black Hearted Love," keyboard on "April"
Carla Azar – drums on "Black Hearted Love" and "April"
Giovanni Ferrario – guitar on "Black Hearted Love," bass guitar on "April"
Jean-Marc Butty – drums (live shows in support of A Woman a Man Walked By)

Chart positions

References

2009 albums
Collaborative albums
PJ Harvey albums
Albums produced by Flood (producer)
Island Records albums
Albums produced by John Parish